Evan Nichols (born July 29, 2004) is an American ice sled hockey player. He was a member of the United States national team that won gold at the 2022 Winter Paralympics.

Career
Nichols made his international debut with the United States national team during the 2022 Winter Paralympics and won a gold medal. At 17 years old, he was the youngest member on the Paralympic sled hockey roster.

Evan Nichols started his sled hockey career in 2014 when he played for the DC Sled Sharks.

References 

2004 births
Living people
People from Haymarket, Virginia
American sledge hockey players
Paralympic sledge hockey players of the United States
Paralympic gold medalists for the United States
Para ice hockey players at the 2022 Winter Paralympics
Medalists at the 2022 Winter Paralympics
Paralympic medalists in sledge hockey
21st-century American people